Endosialin is a protein that in humans is encoded by the CD248 gene.

Endosialin is a member of the “Group XIV”, a novel family of C-type lectin transmembrane receptors which play a role not only in cell–cell adhesion processes but also in host defence. This family comprise three other members, CLEC14A, CD93 and Thrombomodulin the latter of which are better characterized. 

The function of endosialin remains elusive, but its expression has been associated with angiogenesis in the embryo and uterus and in tumor development and growth.

See also
 Cluster of differentiation

References

Further reading

External links
 
 

Clusters of differentiation